Jimmy Landes (born August 13, 1992) is a former American football long snapper. He played college football at Baylor University and was drafted by the Detroit Lions in the sixth round of the 2016 NFL Draft with the 210th overall pick.

Professional career

Detroit Lions
Landes was drafted by the Detroit Lions in the sixth round, 210th overall, in the 2016 NFL Draft. On August 29, 2016, Landes was placed on injured reserve with a shoulder injury.

On June 15, 2017, Landes was released by the Lions.

References

External links
 Baylor Bears bio

1992 births
Living people
Sportspeople from Tyler, Texas
Players of American football from Texas
American football long snappers
Baylor Bears football players
Detroit Lions players